The Fresno Frenzy were an expansion af2 team for the 2002 season. Fresno was joined by the Albany Conquest, Bakersfield Blitz, Cape Fear Wildcats, Hawaiian Islanders, Mobile Wizards, Mohegan Wolves, New Haven Ninjas, San Diego Riptide & the Wilkes-Barre/Scranton Pioneers. In 2002, they played their home games in Selland Arena, in which they finished 4–12, dead last in the Western Division of the National Conference. Despite going an even 4–4 in Fresno, they bombshelled on the road, going 0-8 that season. After the 2002 season, they folded after one year in Fresno. Arena football would return later to Fresno in 2004, when the original Bakersfield Blitz moved to Fresno, and called themselves the Central Valley Coyotes.

Season-by-Season

References

External links
 Fresno Frenzy on ArenaFan.com

Defunct af2 teams
Sports in Fresno, California
American football teams established in 2001
American football teams disestablished in 2002
Defunct American football teams in California
2001 establishments in California
2002 disestablishments in California